The Squealer is a 1930 American pre-Code
crime film directed by Harry Joe Brown and starring Jack Holt, Dorothy Revier and Davey Lee.

The film's sets were designed by the art director Edward C. Jewell.

Cast
 Jack Holt as Charles Hart 
 Dorothy Revier as Margaret Hart 
 Davey Lee as Bunny Hart 
 Matt Moore as John Sheridan 
 Zasu Pitts as Bella 
 Robert Ellis as Valleti 
 Matthew Betz as Red Majors 
 Arthur Housman as Mitter Davis 
Cesar Miramontes as Pablo
 Louis Natheaux as Ratface Edwards 
 Eddie Kane as Whisper 
 Eddie Sturgis as The Killer

References

Bibliography
 Charles Stumpf. ZaSu Pitts: The Life and Career. McFarland, 2010.

External links
 

1930 films
1930 crime films
American black-and-white films
American crime films
Films directed by Harry Joe Brown
Columbia Pictures films
1930 drama films
1930s English-language films
1930s American films